Bar Paly; born Varvara Paley, is an Israeli-American actress and model.

Early life
 
Paly was born Varvara Alexandrovna Paley in 1985, in Nizhny Tagil, Russia (former USSR), to Olga (née Dnrob) and Alexander Paley. Her grandfathers served in the Soviet Red Army during World War II. She was passionate about music in her childhood, playing the piano from age four. Her family immigrated to Israel when she was nine, and she was raised in Tel Aviv, Israel. In her school days, her interest in acting led her to enroll at the Aleph High School of Arts Tel Aviv-Yafo, Israel, where she performed in a number of productions by William Shakespeare and Bertolt Brecht, such as the play Antigone.

Career

Modelling
Paly began a career in modeling at the age of 17. She has appeared as a cover girl in several magazines, including Maxim, Rolling Stone and GQ.

She posed for the cover of Esquires Latin American edition in May 2014.

Acting
In 2003, she began her career as an actress appearing in a variety of roles for television and appeared in the Israeli mockumentary television film Zehirut Matzlema.

Paly has appeared in TV's How I Met Your Mother, The Starter Wife, and the 2008 horror film The Ruins.

In 2013, Paly held roles in both Roman Coppola's A Glimpse Inside the Mind of Charles Swan III starring Charlie Sheen, Jason Schwartzman and Bill Murray.

She also had a supporting role in Michael Bay's Pain & Gain, alongside Mark Wahlberg and Dwayne Johnson.

She also played in the 2014 action thriller film Non-Stop, opposite Liam Neeson.

Since 2015, Paly has had a recurring role as Anastasia "Anna" Kolcheck on the American crime drama NCIS: Los Angeles.

Between 2017 and 2018 she played Helen of Troy in the Arrowverse show DC's Legends of Tomorrow.

Personal life
Paly is of Russian Jewish descent. In August 2016, Paly became a naturalized U.S. citizen.

Filmography

Notes

References

External links
 Official website (archived version)
 

Living people
21st-century American actresses
21st-century Israeli actresses
American female models
Israeli emigrants to the United States
Israeli female models
Israeli film actresses
Israeli people of Russian-Jewish descent
American people of Israeli descent
American people of Russian-Jewish descent 
American film actresses
Israeli television actresses
American television actresses
People from Nizhny Tagil
People from Tel Aviv
Russian emigrants to Israel 
Naturalized citizens of the United States
Year of birth missing (living people)